The Washington Park Futurity Stakes was an American Thoroughbred horse race run annually at the now defunct Washington Park Race Track in Woodlawn, Chicago. A race on dirt for two-year-olds, it was first run in 1937 as a six furlong event. Placed on hiatus for two years, it returned as an annual feature in 1940.

From 1959 through 1961 the race was hosted by Chicago's Arlington Park race track where it was run at a distance of six and a half furlongs. Made permanent at Arlington Park, the Washington Park Futurity was merged with the Arlington Futurity Stakes and is known as the Arlington-Washington Futurity Stakes.

Race notes
During its tenure, the Washington Park Futurity hosted some of the best horses in the United States. 
 The 1941 edition was won by future U.S. Racing Hall of Fame inductee, Alsab.
 In 1947, Bewitch won, Citation finished second, and Free America was third. All three horses were owned by Calumet Farm and all were trained by Jimmy Jones. 
 1953 winner Hasty Road went on to win the 1954 Preakness Stakes
 1959 winner Venetian Way won the next year's Kentucky Derby

Records
Speed record: (at distance of 6 furlongs)
 1:09.60 - Swoon's Son (1955), Restless Wind (1958), Venetian Way (1959)

Most wins by a jockey:
 3 - Bill Hartack (1956, 1957, 1961)

Most wins by an owner:
 3 - John Marsch (1942, 1943, 1944)
 3 - Fred W. Hooper (1946, 1956, 1960)

Winners

† In 1956, California Kid won but was disqualified bumping in the stretch and set back to second.

Notes

References
 June 26, 1937 Palm Beach Post article on the inaugural running of the Washington Park Futurity
 September 3, 1961 New York Times article on the 1961 edition of the Washington Park Futurity

Recurring events established in 1937
Discontinued horse races in the United States
Flat horse races for two-year-olds
Horse races in the United States
Horse racing in Illinois
Recurring events disestablished in 1961